TalkTalk Business (trading name of TalkTalk Communications Ltd) is a business broadband, telephone, mobile phone and IT support provider owned by TalkTalk Group.  The division supports approximately 180,000 UK businesses, and 350 resellers, that include voice and data specialists, system integrators and carriers.

History
TalkTalk Business was founded in 1995 by Neil McArthur as Opal Telecoms. TalkTalk Business changed its name from Opal Telecom on 1 February 2011. However it has its origins in many business divisions of telecommunications companies that have been taken over including Pipex, Opal Telecom, Freedom2surf, Nildram and Tiscali.

TalkTalk Group (trading as TalkTalk) was founded in 2003 as a subsidiary of Carphone Warehouse and was de-merged as a standalone company in March 2010.

Timeline
1995: Opal Telecom founded
2000: Provision of first hosted inbound services
2002: Acquired by Carphone Warehouse for £103m
2005: Vartec, Telequip and the UK operations of One.Tel acquired
2006: Ecocall and Totem acquired
2009: TalkTalk and Carphone Warehouse demerge
2010: Opal becomes TalkTalk Business to allow it to leverage TalkTalk Group scale and brand. TalkTalk acquires UK operations of Tiscali
2011: TalkTalk Business acquired Executel and V-Networks

Products
TalkTalk Business provides communication products such as voice and broadband connectivity.

References

TalkTalk Group
Telecommunications companies of the United Kingdom
Internet service providers of the United Kingdom